Laura Pavel (born 19 October 1968) is a Romanian essayist and literary critic.

Biography
Daughter of Dora Pavel, writer, and Eugen Pavel, linguist, scientific researcher. Married to the literary critic Călin Teutişan. She has a BA in Letters of the "Babeş-Bolyai" University in Cluj-Napoca, the Romanian-English section (1992). PhD in Letters (Literary and Drama Theory), with a thesis dedicated to Eugène Ionesco (2002). She is part of the literary group gathered around the cultural journal Echinox. Research fellowships at the Université Libre de Bruxelles (1993), Indiana University of Bloomington (1997) and the University of Amsterdam (2000). Presently she is Professor at the Faculty of Theatre and Television of the "Babeş-Bolyai" University.

Published works

Volumes of essays and literary criticism
 Antimemoriile lui Grobei. Eseu monografic despre opera lui Nicolae Breban [The Antimemoirs of Grobei. A monographical essay on the oeuvre of Nicolae Breban], Bucharest, Ed. Didactică şi Pedagogică, 1997, 166 p.; the 2nd edition, Bucharest, Ed. Fundaţiei Culturale Ideea Europeană, 2004, 202 p.
 Ionesco. Anti-lumea unui sceptic [Ionesco. The Anti-word of a skeptic], Piteşti, Ed. Paralela 45, 2002, 316 p.
 Ficţiune şi teatralitate [Fiction and Theatricality], Cluj, Ed. Limes, 2003, 176 p.
 Dumitru Țepeneag şi canonul literaturii alternative [Dumitru Ţepeneag and the Canon of Alternative Literature], Cluj, Casa Cărţii de Ştiinţă, 2007, 180 p.
 Dumitru Tsepeneag and the Canon of Alternative Literature, translated by Alistair Ian Blyth, Champaign & Dublin & London, Dalkey Archive Press, 2011, 214 p.
 Teatru și identitate. Interpretări pe scena interioară / Theatre and Identity. Interpretations on the Inner Stage, Cluj, Casa Cărții de Știință, 2012, 230 p.
 Ionesco. L’antimondo di uno scettico, traduzione di Maria Luisa Lombardo, Roma, Aracne editrice, 2016, 316 p. 
 Personaje ale teoriei, ființe ale ficțiunii, Iași, Institutul European, 2021, 338 p.

Prefaces; edited volumes
 Nicolae Breban, Bunavestire, 4th edition, preface, chronology and critical references, Piteşti, Ed. Paralela 45, 2002.
 Sorin Crişan, Jocul nebunilor, preface, Cluj, Ed. Dacia, 2003.
 Dumitru Țepeneag, La belle Roumaine, 2nd edition, preface, Bucharest, Ed. Art, 2007.
 Nicolae Breban, Bunavestire, 5th edition, chronology and critical references, Bucharest, Jurnalul Naţional & Ed. Curtea Veche, 2011.

Translations
 Melanie Klein, Iubire, vinovăţie, reparaţie [Love, Guilt and Reparation], translation from English, in collaboration, Binghamton & Cluj, Ed. S. Freud, 1994.
 Evelyn Underhill, Mistica [Mysticism], translation from English, Cluj, Ed. "Biblioteca Apostrof", 1995.

Collective volumes
 Dicţionar analitic de opere literare româneşti [Analytical Dictionary of Romanian Literary Works], edited by Ion Pop, vol. I-IV (1998–2003); final edition, Cluj, Casa Cărţii de Ştiinţă, 2007 (co-author).
 Ionesco după Ionesco / Ionesco après Ionesco, Cluj, Casa Cărţii de Ştiinţă, 2000 (co-author).
 Dumitru Tsepeneag. Les Métamorphoses d'un créateur : écrivain, théoricien, traducteur (Les actes du colloque organisé les 14-15 avril 2006), Timişoara, Editura Universităţii de Vest, 2006 (co-author).
 T(z)ara noastră. Stereotipii şi prejudecăţi, Bucharest, Institutul Cultural Român, 2006 (co-author).
 Poetica dell'immaginario. Imago 2, coordonator Gisèle Vanhese, Arcavacata di Rende (Cosenza), Centro Editoriale e Librario dell'Università della Calabria, 2010 (co-author).
 Multiculturalismo e multilinguismo / Multiculturalisme et multilinguisme, a cura di Gisèle Vanhese, Quaderni del Dipartimento di Linguistica. Università della Calabria, 25, 2010 (co-author).
 Dicţionarul cronologic al romanului românesc. 1990-2000, Bucharest, Editura Academiei Române, 2011 (co-author).
 Dicționarul general al literaturii române, A–B. Ediția a II-a revizuită, adăugită și adusă la zi, București, Editura Muzeul Literaturii Române, 2016 (co-author).
 Dicționarul general al literaturii române, C. Ediția a II-a revizuită, adăugită și adusă la zi, București, Editura Muzeul Literaturii Române, 2016 (co-author).
 Dicționarul cronologic al romanului tradus în România. 1990‒2000, Cluj-Napoca, Institutul de Lingvistică și Istorie Literară „Sextil Pușcariu”, 2017 (co-author).
 Dicționarul general al literaturii române, D–G. Ediția a II-a revizuită, adăugită și adusă la zi, București, Editura Muzeul Literaturii Române, 2017 (co-author).
 Dicționarul general al literaturii române, H–L. Ediția a II-a revizuită, adăugită și adusă la zi, București, Editura Muzeul Literaturii Române, 2017 (co-author).
 Victor Man: Luminary Petals on a Wet, Black Bow , New York, Sternberg Press, 2017 (co-author). 
 Dicționarul general al literaturii române, M–O. Ediția a II-a revizuită, adăugită și adusă la zi, București, Editura Muzeul Literaturii Române, 2019 (co-author).
 Enciclopedia imaginariilor din România, coordonator general Corin Braga, vol. V, Imaginar și patrimoniu artistic, volum coordonat de Liviu Malița, Iași, Polirom, 2020 (co-author).

Affiliations
 Member of the Writers Union of Romania
 Member of Conseil International d'Études Francophones (CIEF)
 Member of the Association of General and Comparative Literature of Romania (ALGCR)
 Member in the editorial board of the academic journal Studia Universitatis Babeş-Bolyai, series Dramatica

Awards
 The Prize for Debut at the National Bookfare (1997)
 The Prize "Henri Jacquier" of the French Cultural Center in Cluj (2002)
 The Excellence Award of the "Babeş-Bolyai" University (2002)
 The Prize "Book of the Year - Literary History and Criticism" of the Romanian Writers' Union, Cluj (2007)

References

  Gheorghe Grigurcu, in România literară, no. 11, March 19-25, 2003.
   Alex Goldiş, in Cultura, no. 45 (149), November 15, 2007.
 Dana Pârvan-Jenaru, in Observator cultural, no. 152 (410), February 14-20, 2008.
  Irina Petraş, in Apostrof, no. 2, 2008.

Further reading
 Gabriel Dimisianu, Lumea criticului, Bucharest, Ed. Fundaţiei Culturale Române, 2000, pp. 153–158.
 Ion Bogdan Lefter, Scriitori români din anii '80-'90. Dicţionar bio-bibliografic, vol. III, Piteşti, Ed. Paralela 45, 2001, pp. 29–30.
 Irina Petraş, Cărţile deceniului 10, Cluj, Casa Cărţii de Ştiinţă, 2003, pp. 334–336.
 Idem, Literatura română contemporană. O panoramă, Bucharest, Ed. Ideea Europeană, 2008, pp. 671–674.
 Dicţionar Echinox, coordonateur Horea Poenar, Bucharest & Cluj, Ed. Tritonic, 2004, pp. 278–281; the 2nd edition, Piteşti, Ed. Paralela 45, 2008, pp. 298–303.
 Aurel Sasu, Dicţionarul biografic al literaturii române, M-Z, Piteşti, Ed. Paralela 45, 2006, p. 311.
 Dicţionarul general al literaturii române, P-R, Bucharest, Ed. Univers Enciclopedic, 2006, pp. 110–111.
 Dicționarul general al literaturii române, ediția a II-a revizuită, adăugită și adusă la zi, vol. VI, P–R, Bucharest, Ed. Muzeul Literaturii Române, 2021, pp. 172-173.

External links
  The Romanian Writers’ Union, Cluj
   Publishing House Paralela 45
  Associazione Italiana di Romenistica (AIR)
  Critiques et exégèses de l'œuvre d'Eugène Ionesco

Romanian essayists
Romanian literary critics
Romanian women literary critics
Romanian translators
Romanian women writers
Romanian writers
Babeș-Bolyai University alumni
Academic staff of Babeș-Bolyai University
Place of birth missing (living people)
Living people
1968 births
Romanian women essayists